The 2004 Asian Weightlifting Championships were held in Almaty in Kazakhstan between April 7 and April 12, 2004. It was the 36th men's and 17th women's championship. The event was organised by the Asian Weightlifting Federation.

Medal summary

Men

Women

Medal table 

Ranking by Big (Total result) medals 

Ranking by all medals: Big (Total result) and Small (Snatch and Clean & Jerk)

Participating nations 
150 athletes from 22 nations competed.

 (15)
 (1)
 (9)
 (8)
 (8)
 (10)
 (1)
 (15)
 (8)
 (2)
 (11)
 (5)
 (9)
 (3)
 (6)
 (2)
 (2)
 (14)
 (8)
 (8)
 (3)
 (2)

References
Men's Results
Women's Results

Asian Weightlifting Championships
Asian Weightlifting Championships
Weightlifting Championships
Asian Weightlifting Championships